Associazione Sportiva Dilettantistica Gruppo Calcio CastelnuovoSandrà is an Italian association football club, based in Castelnuovo del Garda, Veneto, and also representing the frazione of "Sandrà".

History
The club was founded in 2005 after the merger of two dinstinct sides in the towns it represents.

The season 2010–11
CastelnuovoSandrà in the season 2010–11, from Serie D group B relegated to Eccellenza Veneto, the next year to promote.

Colors and badge
The team's colors are white, blue, green and black: the kit is all-white and has a hoop in the style of Sampdoria.

External links
Official Site

Football clubs in Italy
Football clubs in Veneto
Association football clubs established in 2005
2005 establishments in Italy